Triple witching hour is the last hour of the stock market trading session (3:00-4:00 P.M., New York City local Time) on the third Friday of every March, June, September, and December.  Those days are the expiration of three kinds of securities:
 Stock market index futures;
 Stock market index options;
 Stock options.

The simultaneous expirations generally increases the trading volume of options, futures, and their underlying stocks, occasionally increasing the volatility of prices of related securities.

On those same days single-stock futures also expire, so that the final hour is sometimes referred to as the quadruple witching hour.

Concept and usage
The term "triple witching" refers to the extra volatility resulting from the expiration dates of the three financing instruments, and is based on the witching hour denoting the active time for witches.  

It is used often and is considered industry jargon, along with the synonym, Freaky Friday.

See also
Program trading
Swing trading

Notes

Derivatives (finance)